Velyki Dederkaly is a village in Kremenets Raion, Ternopil Oblast, Ukraine. It hosts the administration of Velyki Dederkaly urban hromada, one of the hromadas of Ukraine.

Until 18 July 2020, Velyki Dederkaly was located in Shumsk Raion. The raion was abolished in July 2020 as part of the administrative reform of Ukraine, which reduced the number of raions of Ternopil Oblast to three. The area of Shumsk Raion was merged into Kremenets Raion.

References

Villages in Kremenets Raion